Mohamed Ali Gouaned (محمد علي قواند) (5 July 2002, Biskra) is an Algerian middle-distance runner specializing in the 400 meters and 800 meters. He holds the Junior World best in 600 meters with a time of 1:14:79 set in Algiers on 26 March 2021  breaking the record held by Wilfred Bungei since 1 September 1999 with a time of 1:14:94.

Gouaned won a silver medal in the 800m Youth race at the 2019 African U18 and U20 Championships in Athletics held in Abidjan (Côte d'Ivoire) behind Abdo Razack Hassan from Djibouti setting in the process an Algerian Youth record in 800m with a time of 1:47:88. Gouaned also won a silver medal in the 800m at the Athletics at the 2018 Summer Youth Olympics held in Buenes Aires (Argentina) behind Tasew Yada of Ethiopia.

Gouaned also holds the Algerian Youth record in 400m with 46:76 established in Ninove meeting Belgium in 2019. He also set a national junior record (NJR) in 800m race with a time of 1:46:35 in Batna Meeting (Algeria) after finishing second to Djamel Sejati. Later in May 2021, Gouaned won 800m race B at the 2021 Doha Diamond League meeting improving the NJR to 1:45.47

Gouaned won a gold medal at the 2021 Arab Athletics Championships held in Tunis (Tunisia) in the 800 m race with a time 1:46.67 ahead of Moroccan Oussama Nabil, and won a silver medal in the 400 m race at the same championships setting in the process a personal best of 46.72 sec behind Taha Hussein Yaseen from Iraq. On 29 June 2021, he ran another personal best on the 400 m with a time of 46.21 at the SATO stadium (Algiers).

On August 22, 2021, Gouaned finished second at the 2021 World Athletics U20 Championships in Nairobi second after Emmanuel Wanyonyi setting another Algerian junior record in 800 with a time of 1:44.45. The three medalists Wanyonyi, Gouaned, and Kibet all achieved faster times in the final than the Olympic champion Emmanuel Korir earlier in Tokyo.

Personal bests
Outdoor
200 metres – 21.64 (Tlemcen, 13 July 2019)
400 metres – 46.21 (Algiers, 29 June 2021)
600 metres – 1:14.79 (Algiers, 26 March 2021)
800 metres – 1:44.43 (NJR) (Nairobi, 19 June 2022)
1000 metres – 2:20.24 (Algiers, 27 March 2021)

References

2002 births
Living people
Athletes (track and field) at the 2018 Summer Youth Olympics
Algerian male middle-distance runners
21st-century Algerian people
Athletes (track and field) at the 2022 Mediterranean Games
Mediterranean Games gold medalists in athletics
Mediterranean Games gold medalists for Algeria
Algerian male sprinters